Municipal Stadium is a multi-purpose stadium in Mombasa, Kenya.  It is used mostly for football matches and holds 10,000 people.

References

External links 
 World Stadium
 virtualglobetrotting

Football venues in Kenya
Buildings and structures in Mombasa
Multi-purpose stadiums in Kenya